Thiago Maciel Santiago or simply Thiago Maciel  (born 7 August 1982), is a Brazilian former football right back.

Career
In the 2008 season, he signed a 3-year contract with Tombense, and he was loaned to Ipatinga in January, Macaé in March before signed for Bahia in June. But in August he returned to Alania.

After leaving Alania, in March 2009 he signed for Duque de Caxias. He has never played in a competitive game for them, as his contract was terminated only 15 days later.

References

External links
 zerozero.pt
 globoesporte
 CBF
 Guardian Stats Centre
 sambafoot

1982 births
Living people
Brazilian footballers
Brazilian expatriate footballers
CR Vasco da Gama players
FC Spartak Vladikavkaz players
Ipatinga Futebol Clube players
America Football Club (RJ) players
Volta Redonda FC players
Guarani FC players
Expatriate footballers in Russia
Russian Premier League players
Association football defenders